Anguillicoloides papernai is a parasitic nematode worm that lives in the swimbladders of eels (Anguilla spp.), particularly Anguilla mossambica. Specimens have been located in Cape Province, South Africa. It is named after Dr. Ilan Paperna. What differentiates this species from its congeners is the presence of marked cuticular excrescences on the anterior and posterior ends of the body and the location of the buccal capsule deeply inside the head end. This species was the first Anguillicola member described from Africa.

The state of being colonized by Anguillicola nematodes is termed anguillicolosis.

Description
Its body is spirally coiled and darkly coloured (due to eel blood inside the nematode's intestine). It is fusiform, tapering to both ends; anterior end of the body is bottle-shaped, while the posterior end is narrowed and conical. The epicuticle is finely wrinkled, with a network structure, forming an irregular fine transparent coating. The cuticle of the anterior and

posterior parts of its body bear several papilla-like excrescences of a fibrous structured. Its head end is rounded, being separated by a slight constriction in front of the nerve ring. The entire anterior narrowed part of its body is approximately twice as long as the oesophagus. Four dorso- and ventro-lateral papillae and two small lateral amphids are present. The mouth is conspicuously depressed, the anterior margin of the buccal capsule being 0.027mm-0.030mm from the anterior extremity; the mouth opening is circular. The buccal capsule is well sclerotised, trapezium-shaped in lateral view, its anterior rim bearing one row of 26 circular teeth. Its oesophagus is strongly muscular and expanded at its posterior half, its lumen being triangular. The valvular apparatus of the oesophagus is well developed.

The excretory pore is located near the junction of the oesophagus and intestine. The intestine is dark, almost straight, broad, being narrowed at its anterior and posterior ends only. Three conspicuously large oval unicellular rectal glands are present, one dorsal and two subventral. The tail is conical and short.

References

Further reading 
Kennedy, C. R. (1993). Introductions, spread and colonization of new localities by fish helminth and crustacean parasites in the British Isles: a perspective and appraisal. Journal of Fish Biology, 43: 287–301.
Koops, H., & Hartmann, F. (1989). Anguillicola infestations in Germany and in German eel imports. Journal of Applied Ichthyology, 1: 41–45.

External links 

Camallanida
Nematodes described in 1988